The Meat and Livestock Commission, (MLC), was set up by the UK Government under the Agriculture Act 1967 with Government money with the remit to promote the sale of red meat. The MLC was previously an independent non-departmental public body, but from 1 April 2008 it was superseded by the Agriculture and Horticulture Development Board.

Funding
The MLC's income derived from a levy on every slaughtered carcass with additional funding directly from the Government.  it had an annual budget of £42 million for marketing and advertising  to promote meat to the British population.

Meat promotion
The MLC's remit was to "work with the British meat and livestock industry (cattle, sheep and pigs) to improve its efficiency and competitive position" and "to maintain and stimulate markets for British meat at home and abroad, while taking into account the needs of consumers." 

In 2000 alone, the MLC and the Government jointly funded a £4.6 million ad campaign to promote British pig meat.

Controversy
In 2006 the British arm of People for the Ethical Treatment of Animals (PETA) unveiled a poster  linking eating meat with child abuse. The MLC branded the poster "irresponsible". However,  the Advertising Standards Authority (ASA) agreed that PETA can continue to place ads expressing this point of view., stating that “While we recognised that some viewers would find the text used in the ad inappropriate, we understood that PETA had intended to convey that, in their opinion, feeding meat to children, and thereby exposing them to potentially harmful influences, was tantamount to abuse”.

See also
English Beef and Lamb Executive (EBLEX)
Single Payment Scheme

Notes

External links

Department for Environment, Food and Rural Affairs
Agricultural organisations based in the United Kingdom
1967 establishments in the United Kingdom
2008 disestablishments in the United Kingdom
Organizations established in 1967
Meat industry organizations
Advocacy groups in the United Kingdom